Sebastian Fülle (born 27 July 1992) is a German professional basketball player who plays for the TKS 49ers of the German ProB league where he has been team captain. He formerly played for Alba Berlin of the German Basketball League. Fülle made his debut with Alba Berlin-2, Pro-B, during the 2009-10 season.

References

External links
Eurocup Profile
German BBL Profile
Eurobasket.com Profile

1992 births
Living people
Basketball players from Berlin
Alba Berlin players
German men's basketball players
Shooting guards